HSwMS Göteborg was a destroyer of the Royal Swedish Navy that served during the Second World War and in the Cold War. The lead ship of the class,Göteborg was launched on 14 October 1935 as an improvement on the previous . The destroyer was sunk during the Hårsfjärden disaster of 7 September 1941 when an explosion amongst the torpedoes mounted aft led to the loss of thirty lives, the largest number in Swedish territorial waters during the war. The destroyer was repaired and re-entered operations protecting Sweden's neutrality until the end of the war. The destroyer served until 15 August 1958 when the vessel was retired. Göteborg was subsequently sunk as a target on 14 August 1962. The name of the ship was also used as a cover by the  during the invasion of Norway in April 1940.

Design and development

In 1933, the Swedish Riksdag authorised two ships based on the design of the .The new design was to have a higher speed, achieved by introducing superheating and lightening the structure through using welding rather than rivets. The design proved successful and was subsequently reordered, ultimately leading to a class of 6 vessels named after towns. Göteborg was the lead ship of the class and the first laid down.

Power was provided by three Penhoët oil-fired boilers feeding two de Laval geared steam turbines driving two shafts. The ship had two funnels.

The main armament consisted of three  K/45 M24C dual-purpose guns produced by Bofors. These were placed in separate mounts on the ship's centreline, with one on the forecastle, one aft and one between the funnels. Air defence consisted six  M/40 autocannons, also provided by Bofors. These were in a twin mounting aft of the bridge and two single mounts to port and starboard. Two triple rotating torpedo tube mounts for  torpedoes were aft of the superstructure and two depth charge throwers were carried further towards the stern. Approximately forty mines could also be carried for minelaying. The ship had a complement of 135 officers and ratings.

Construction and career

Göteborg was laid down by Götaverken in Gothenburg in 1934, launched on 14 October 1935 and commissioned on 30 October 1936. The ship was named for the city, called Gothenburg in English, and allocated the pennant number J5. Initially serving with the Coastal Fleet, the destroyer was transferred to the Gothenburg Squadron on 27 August 1940. On 8 April 1940, during the invasion of Norway, a ship claiming to be Göteborg was fired on by the British destroyer .

On 17 September 1941, the destroyer was on patrol and drove off a Focke-Wulf Fw 200 Condor maritime patrol aircraft which was harassing a convoy. On 27 September, Göteborg was at the centre of the Hårsfjärden disaster. The destroyer was docked at Hårsfjärden when the torpedoes exploded, followed by a similar explosion aboard the destroyer  which was nearby. Göteborg sank in the harbour. Burning oil spilt onto the water, and thirty three lives were lost, although the loss would have been worse had the majority of the crew not been on shore leave at the time.  Nonetheless, it was the worst loss of life the country experienced in its territorial waters during the conflict.

On 18 September 1943, the ship was recommissioned after extensive repairs. Göteborg achieved an even higher speed of  during trials. However, the damage had taken its toll. When the rest of the class were modernised and re-equipped to become anti-submarine frigates during the Cold War between 1948 and 1951, Göteborg was not. Instead, the ship was decommissioned on 15 August 1958 and subsequently sunk as a target on 14 August 1962.

References

Citations

Bibliography

 
 
 
 
 
 
 
 
 
 
 
 

1935 ships
Destroyers of the Swedish Navy
Ships built in Karlskrona
World War II naval ships of Sweden